Rudolf Hanel was an Austrian footballer who played for a number of clubs in Austria. He featured twice for the Austria national football team in 1926, scoring two goals.

Career statistics

International

International goals
Scores and results list Austria's goal tally first.

References

Date of birth unknown
Date of death unknown
Footballers from Vienna
Austrian footballers
Austria international footballers
Association football midfielders
Wiener AC players